Jamie McCormack (born 1 February 1992) is a Scottish professional footballer who plays for Bo'ness United in the Scottish Lowland Football League. 

McCormack has previously played for Heart of Midlothian, Wigan Athletic, Greenock Morton, Brechin City, Stenhousemuir, East Stirlingshire, and BSC Glasgow.

Club career
McCormack signed for Wigan Athletic's development squad in 2011 after being released by Hearts. He left Wigan when his contract wasn't renewed, having been out for thirteen months after suffering a cruciate ligament injury.

In January 2014, McCormack signed for Scottish Championship side Greenock Morton on a free transfer. He left Morton after four months at the club, in May 2014.

On 25 July 2014, McCormack signed for Brechin City.

After playing two matches as a trialist, McCormack signed for Stenhousemuir on 30 January 2015. After two-and-a-half years with Stenhousemuir, McCormack was released at the end of the 2016–17 season.

McCormack signed for Lowland League club East Stirlingshire on 1 July 2017 and would later sign for league rivals BSC Glasgow in 2019.

Bo'ness United manager Max Christie signed McCormack in May 2021 on a precontract for the 2021-22 Lowland League season.

References

External links

Living people
Greenock Morton F.C. players
1992 births
Association football fullbacks
Footballers from Stirling
Scottish footballers
Wigan Athletic F.C. players
Scottish Professional Football League players
Heart of Midlothian F.C. players
Brechin City F.C. players
Stenhousemuir F.C. players
East Stirlingshire F.C. players
Lowland Football League players
Broomhill F.C. (Scotland) players